Yang Le (born 10 November 1939) is a Chinese mathematician. He is a member of the Chinese Academy of Sciences.

Biography
Yang was born and raised in Nantong, Jiangsu. His father, Yang Jingyuan, was a businessman and assistant manager of Nantong Tongming Electric Company. His mother named Zhou Jingjuan.  He primarily studied at the First Affiliated Primary School of Nantong Normal College and secondary studied at Nantong Middle School of Jiangsu Province. He was accepted to Peking University in 1956 and graduated in 1962. After college, he studied mathematics under Xiong Qinglai at Chinese Academy of Sciences, and started working there as a research scientist after the graduate program. He was elected a fellow of the Chinese Academy of Sciences in 1980.

Personal life
Yang married Huang Qieyuan, who is Huang Wanli's daughter.

References

1939 births
Living people
20th-century Chinese mathematicians
21st-century Chinese  mathematicians
Mathematicians from Jiangsu
Members of the Chinese Academy of Sciences
Peking University alumni
Scientists from Nantong